Christ Church, Jerusalem, is an Anglican church located inside the Old City of Jerusalem, established in 1849 by the London Society for Promoting Christianity Amongst the Jews. It was the original seat of the Anglican Bishop in Jerusalem until the opening of St. George's Cathedral, Jerusalem in 1899; the compound also included the 19th century British Consulate. From its inception, Christ Church has been supporting a form of Christianity focused on Jesus' Jewishness, offering Christian texts translated into Hebrew by its own leaders.

The building itself is part of a small compound just inside the Jaffa Gate opposite King David's citadel. Consecrated by Bishop Samuel Gobat in 21 January 1849, it is the oldest Protestant church building in the Middle East.

Its congregation is mainly composed of English-speaking Jewish Christians, with both Christian and Jewish festivals being celebrated.

History
Originally named the "Apostolic Anglican Church", it was consecrated as "Christ Church" on 21 January 1849 by Bishop Samuel Gobat. Three architects worked on the church: the first (William Curry Hillier) died in 1840 of typhus, while the second (James Wood Johns) was dismissed and replaced by Matthew Habershon in 1843.

The construction of the church was met with considerable local and Ottoman opposition. Lord Shaftesbury and other prominent Restorationists lobbied consecutive Foreign Secretaries in its advocacy. On 18 March 1845 a petition signed by 1,400 clergy and 15,000 laity was presented to Lord Aberdeen in support of the project.

Christ Church was the seat of the Anglican Bishop in Jerusalem until the opening of St. George's Cathedral, Jerusalem in 1899.

Prior to the outbreak of the First World War, the Christ Church compound was also the site of the British Consulate. The building survived the 1947–1949 Palestine war and the Six-Day War intact and continues to function as an Anglican church with several English, Arabic and Hebrew speaking congregations. The current rector is David Pileggi.

The London Society for Promoting Christianity Amongst the Jews (now known as the Church's Ministry Among Jewish People or CMJ) helped finance the church's construction.

Description
In the church's apse a plaque contains the Apostles' Creed, the Lord's Prayer, and the Ten Commandments, all three in Hebrew.

Gallery

See also

Anglican-German Bishopric in Jerusalem 
Messianic Jews ("Jews for Jesus")
Conrad Schick (1822–1901), German Protestant missionary, educator, architect and archaeologist
Moses Wilhelm Shapira (1830–1884), member of the Christ Church congregation

References

External links
CMJ Israel web site

Churches completed in 1849
19th-century Anglican church buildings
Protestant churches in Jerusalem
Anglican church buildings in Israel
History of Anglicanism
1849 establishments in the Ottoman Empire